Son of the Regiment, is a 1946 Soviet film directed by Vasili Pronin.

Plot 
During the war, one boy turns out to be without parents and he goes into the reconnaissance. Against the background of battles with the Nazis, the guy is sent to the Suvorov doctrine.

Starring 
 Yuri Yankin as Vanya Sojntsev (as Yura Yankin)
 Aleksandr Morozov as Capt. Yenakiyev
 Pavel Volkov as Sergeant Vasili Ivanovich Kovalyov
 Nikolai Parfyonov as Gorbunov
  as Bidenko
 Vladimir Sinev as Cpl. Voznesensky (as Vova Sinev)
 Arkadi Arkadyev
 Aleksandr Timontayev
 Sofya Garrel 
 Stanislav Chekan 
 Nikolai Yakhontov

References

External links 
 

1946 films
1940s Russian-language films
Soviet war drama films
Soviet black-and-white films
1940s war drama films
1946 drama films